Juan Carlos Sistos is a Mexican racing driver. He has competed in such series as Euroseries 3000 and the European F3 Open Championship. In August 2010 it was announced that Juan Carlos had joined Motul Team West-Tec for British Formula 3 and he took a sensational National Class win on his debut at the famous Silverstone Grand Prix Circuit.

References

External links
 
 

Living people
Mexican racing drivers
Latin America Formula Renault 2000 drivers
LATAM Challenge Series drivers
Auto GP drivers
1992 births
Euroformula Open Championship drivers
People from Lázaro Cárdenas, Michoacán
Sportspeople from Michoacán

British Formula Three Championship drivers
Team West-Tec drivers
De Villota Motorsport drivers